Jean-Henri Magne (15 July 1804, Sauveterre-de-Rouergue – 27 August 1885) was a French veterinarian. 

During his career, he worked as a professor at the École royale vétérinaire de Lyon and at the École nationale vétérinaire d'Alfort, where from 1846, he served as director.

In 1836 he became a member of the Société linnéenne de Lyon, serving as its president in 1841/42. He was also a member of the Académie d'agriculture de France and the Académie vétérinaire de France, being chosen as its president in 1855.

Published works 
From 1848 to 1853, he was director of the agricultural journal, Le Moniteur agricole.
With mycologist Claude Casimir Gillet, he collaborated on Nouvelle flore française (1873), a botanical work that was issued over several editions. He was the author of the following writings:
 Principes d'agriculture et d'hygiène vétérinaire, 1843 – Principles of agriculture and veterinary health.
 Choix des vaches laitières, 1850 – Selection of dairy cows.
 Rapport sur les progrès de la médecine vétérinaire depuis vingt-cinq ans, 1867 – Report on the progress of veterinary medicine for the past twenty-five years.
 Hygiène vétérinaire appliquée (third edition in 1867) – Applied veterinary health.

References 

1804 births
1885 deaths
People from Aveyron
French veterinarians